Robert Hawkins Homestead is a historic home located at Yaphank in Suffolk County, New York.  It was built about 1855 and is a clapboard-sheathed, wood-frame building on a brick foundation.  It has a symmetrical, two-story, three-bay, cruciform plan with low intersecting gable roofs in the Italianate style.  It features a one-story verandah and a large central cupola on the building's rooftop.

It was added to the National Register of Historic Places in 1986, and is directly across the street from the Homan-Gerard House and Mills.

References

External links

Hawkins House (Suffolk County Department of Parks)
Hawkins-Jacobsen House (Longwood's Journey)

Houses on the National Register of Historic Places in New York (state)
Italianate architecture in New York (state)
Houses completed in 1855
Houses in Suffolk County, New York
National Register of Historic Places in Suffolk County, New York
1855 establishments in New York (state)